Najah Hamadi (born 8 March 1984) is a Tunisian football forward.

References

1984 births
Living people
Tunisian footballers
ES Beni-Khalled players
ES Métlaoui players
AS Gabès players
EO Sidi Bouzid players
JS Kairouan players
Olympique Béja players
Stade Tunisien players
US Monastir (football) players
Jendouba Sport players
AS Marsa players
Association football forwards
Tunisian Ligue Professionnelle 1 players